Peter White (1824 – 4 April 1901) was a politician in Queensland, Australia. He was a Member of the Queensland Legislative Assembly. He was elected as the member of the Electoral district of Stanley on 23 August 1883 and served until 23 May 1888.

Life 
Peter White was born on 1824 in Otterburn, Northumberland, England.

Career

Death 
He died on 4 April 1901 at his residence, The Willows, in Laidley, Queensland, Australia.

References

Members of the Queensland Legislative Assembly
1824 births
1901 deaths
19th-century Australian politicians
People from Otterburn, Northumberland